Events from the year 1643 in Denmark.

Incumbents 
 Monarch – Christian IV
 Steward of the Realm – Corfitz Ulfeldt

Events 
Start of the Torstenson War (1643–1645)

Births 
19 February – Bolle Luxdorph, civil servant and landowner (died 1698 in Sweden)

Full date missing
Marie Grubbe, noblewoman (died 1718)

Deaths 

Sophia Brahe, horticulturalist and student of astronomy, chemistry and medicine (born 1556)

References 

 
Denmark
Years of the 17th century in Denmark